Iván Kovács (born 8 February 1970) is a Hungarian épée fencer, who won two Olympic silver medals in the team épée competition.

References

1970 births
Living people
Hungarian male épée fencers
Fencers at the 1992 Summer Olympics
Fencers at the 1996 Summer Olympics
Fencers at the 2000 Summer Olympics
Fencers at the 2004 Summer Olympics
Fencers at the 2008 Summer Olympics
Olympic fencers of Hungary
Olympic silver medalists for Hungary
Olympic medalists in fencing
Martial artists from Budapest
Medalists at the 1992 Summer Olympics
Medalists at the 2004 Summer Olympics
Universiade medalists in fencing
Universiade silver medalists for Hungary
Medalists at the 1995 Summer Universiade
20th-century Hungarian people
21st-century Hungarian people